Samla bilas is a species of sea slug, an aeolid nudibranch, a marine heterobranch mollusc in the family Samlidae.

Description
Samla bilas has a body length of 18–35 mm (1.8-3.5 cm).

Distribution
This species is widely distributed in the Indo-West Pacific and commonly seen on reefs.

References

External links
 

Samlidae
Gastropods described in 1991